Thierry Marcial Kounga Kuaté (born ) is a Cameroonian rugby union player who most recently played for the  in the Currie Cup. His regular position is prop.

In 2013 and 2014, he played club rugby and provincial rugby in South Africa, where he was generally known as David Kuate.

Professional career

Raiders / Falcons

Kounga Kuaté was born in Bandjoun, Cameroon. He left Cameroon in 2012 to journey to South Africa, where he settled in Johannesburg, where he joined club side Raiders. He represented them in the 2013 SARU Community Cup, making four appearances as they finished third in Pool C of the competition.

Waratahs / Eagles

When Australian Super Rugby side the  toured South Africa in March 2014 during the 2014 Super Rugby season, Kounga Kuaté was invited to train with the side and joined the team for the remainder of their South African tour in Durban and Cape Town.

He appeared for the Waratahs' Gen Blue side during the 2014 Pacific Rugby Cup in their match against Argentine side Pampas XV.

Carcassonne
He agreed a two-year deal in 2016 to play for French club Carcassonne.

Cameroon

Kounga Kuaté has represented , playing for them in a match against Gabon.

References

External links
 Stats on It's Rugby

Cameroonian rugby union players
Living people
1994 births
People from Bafoussam
Rugby union props
Falcons (rugby union) players
New South Wales Waratahs players